I Know Where I'm Going may refer to:

 "I Know Where I'm Going" (folk song), a folk song
 I Know Where I'm Going!, a 1945 film
 "I Know Where I'm Going" (The Judds song), a 1987 number one country hit by The Judds